Terry Hammond (born 26 May 1957) is a former Australian racing cyclist. He won the Australian national road race title in 1983.

Major results

1977
3rd Overall Herald Sun Tour
1978
1st  Overall Herald Sun Tour
1st Stages 1b & 6a
1979
2nd Overall Herald Sun Tour
1982
1st  Overall Herald Sun Tour
1st Stage 1
1983
1st  Road race, National Road Championships
2nd Overall Herald Sun Tour
1st Stages 4, 10 & 14
1984
Herald Sun Tour
1st Stages 8 & 16
1985
1st Stage 14 Herald Sun Tour

References

External links

1957 births
Living people
Australian male cyclists
Cyclists from Sydney